New Jhang is a village in Pakistan situated on the Mangla Rd, 4 km from Dina in Jhelum District, Punjab.  It is 10 km from the Mangla Dam.

History 
The village was founded when the Mangla Dam was created in 1967, inundating many villages. Some of the displaced people settled in what is now known as New Jhang. It started with only a handful of families but has flourished into a large village.

New Jhang is now densely populated and has many shops. There is also a brick factory, a marble factory, a carpet factory, several mosques and an orphanage.

People 
Many of the early settlers migrated to Bradford, UK in the 1970s. They are now restaurateurs and businessmen.

References 

Villages of Jhelum by Manzoor Begum
The Making of the Mangla Dam by S. Akhtar

Populated places in Jhelum District